Moelleriella is a genus of fungi within the Clavicipitaceae family.

The genus name of Moelleriella is in honour of Friedrich Alfred Gustav Jobst Möller  (1860-1922), who was a German botanist and mycologist, forestry scientist, who travelled and studied in the Diplomatic Service in Brasil.

The genus was circumscribed by Giacomo Bresadola in Syll. Fung. vol.14 on page 626 in 1899.

References

External links
Index Fungorum

Sordariomycetes genera
Clavicipitaceae
Taxa named by Giacomo Bresadola